Sir George Hay, 2nd Earl of Kinnoull,  (1596 – 5 October 1644),  was a Scottish peer, military officer, and political official.

Biography

He was the son of George Hay, 1st Earl of Kinnoull, who was created the Earl of Kinnoull by King Charles in 1633, and Margaret, daughter of Sir James Halyburton.

He was a member of the Privy Council, and served as Captain of the Yeomen of the Guard from 1632 to 1635. He was fiercely loyal to as a loyalist to King Charles; he fought in the English Civil War, when he distinguished himself "by unshaken fidelity to his unfortunate sovereign, and gallant and active services as a soldier in his cause."

In 1643, the earl refused to sign the Solemn League and Covenant.

The earl died in Whitehall, 5 October 1644. He was buried at Waltham Abbey Church in Essex.

Family

His older brother, Sir Peter Hay, died unmarried in 1621, leaving George to succeed to the earldom. In 1622, he married Ann, eldest daughter of William Douglas, 7th Earl of Morton. They had six sons and six daughters:

 George Hay, 3rd Earl of Kinnoull
 William Hay, 4th Earl of Kinnoull
 James
 Robert
 Peter, baptized 11 June 1632
 Charles
 Anna
 Margaret
 Mary,  married 6 February 1662, George Keith, 8th Earl Marischal
 Elizabeth
 Jean
 Catherine (11 September 1641 – 11 January 1733)

References

1596 births
1644 deaths
02
Members of the Privy Council of the United Kingdom
Members of the Convention of the Estates of Scotland
Members of the Parliament of Scotland 1639–1641
Officers of the Yeomen of the Guard